Redondo Reservoir is located  north of Yuma in the state of Arizona.

Fish species
 Largemouth Bass
 Catfish (Channel)
 Redear Sunfish
 Bluegill Sunfish
 Bullfrogs

References

External links
 Arizona Fishing Locations Map
 Arizona Boating Locations Facilities Map

Reservoirs in Yuma County, Arizona
Reservoirs in Arizona